Australiopalpa commoni is a species of moth in the family Gelechiidae. It was described by Povolný in 1974. It is found in Australia, where it has been recorded from New South Wales.

References

Gnorimoschemini
Moths described in 1974
Moths of Australia